The Clare Boothe Luce Award was established in 1991 by the Heritage Foundation in memory of Clare Boothe Luce, an American ambassador and conservative U.S. congresswoman. The award is intended for major contributors to the conservative movement.

Recipients 
 1991:  Shelby Cullom Davis and Kathryn Wasserman Davis
 1997: Ronald Reagan
 1998: Milton Friedman and Rose Friedman conservative author and commentator  and former U.S. senator and judge 
 1999: William F. Buckley Jr. 
 2002: Jesse Helms and Margaret Thatcher
 2010: James L. Buckley
 2011: Roger Ailes
 2015: John Von Kannon

References

External links
Remarks by Lady Thatcher on Receiving the Clare Boothe Luce Award

The Heritage Foundation
Awards established in 1991
1991 establishments in the United States